Events in the year 1983 in Turkey.

Parliament
17th Parliament of Turkey (from 6 November)

Incumbents
President – Kenan Evren 
Prime Minister –
 Bülent Ulusu (up to 13 December)
Turgut Özal (from 13 December)
Leader of the opposition – Necdet Calp (from 13 December)

Ruling party and the main opposition
  Ruling party 
 (Technocrat government) (up to 13 December)
Motherland Party (ANAP) (from 13 December)
Main opposition – People’s Party (HP) (from 13 December)

Cabinet
44th government of Turkey (up to 13 December)
45th government of Turkey (from 13 December)

Events

January 
 16 January – Turkish Airlines Flight 158, catches fire, resulting in 45 deaths.
 28 January – Parliamentary Assembly of Council of Europe considers expulsion of Turkey because of alleged human rights violations.

March 
 2 March – Free trade zones created in Aliağa, Antalya and Yumurtalık.
 7 March – Mining accident in Zonguldak results in 79 deaths.
 9 March – Turkish diplomat Galip Balkar was assassinated by Armenian terrorists.

April 
 24 April – Ban on political activities lifted.

May 
 4 May – Doğu Perinçek is sentenced to 12 years in prison.
 16 May – Nationalist Democracy Party founded.
 19 May – Populist Party formed.
 20 May – Turgut Özal forms Motherland Party.
 20 May – Great Turkey Party founded.
 26 May – Social Democracy Party (SODEP) was founded
 29 May – Professor Erdal İnönü founds Social Democracy Party.
 31 May – Military administration closes down Grand the Turkey Party.

June 
 1 June – BTP closed by the military rulers. Süleyman Demirel, former prime minister as well as other politicians of the former Justice Party and Republican People's Party were arrested
 23 June – True Path Party founded.

July 
 5 July – 1983 Biga earthquake
 7 July – National Security Council vetoes 30 founders of True Path Party.
 14 July – Turkish diplomat Dursun Aksoy assassinated by Armenian terrorists.
 15 July – Armenian terrorists bomb the Turkish Airlines check-in counter in Paris, resulting in 7 deaths.

August 
 24 August – Motherland Party receives permission to participate in 6 November elections.
 24 August – TPP and SDP are disqualified from taking part in the elections.

October 
 30 October 1983 Erzurum earthquake with the moment magnitude of 6.6 results in 1,342 deaths.

November 
 2 November – First successful kidney transplantation in Istanbul.
 6 November – MP wins elections by majority.
 15 November – Turkey recognizes Northern Cyprus.

December 
 13 December – First civilian government after the coup of 1980.
 18 December – Erdal İnönü replaces Cezmi Kartay as the chairman of SODEP.

Births
16 June – Naz Elmas, actress
29 August – Saadet Aksoy, actress
10 October – Tolga Zengin, footballer
29 October – Nurcan Taylan, weight lifter
9 December – Neslihan Demir volleyball player

Deaths
8 January – Hüseyin Alp (born 1935), basketball player
19 January – Muhittin Taylan, (born 1910) chief of constitutional court and one time candidate of presidency 
9 March – Galip Balkar (born 1836), ambassador (assassinated)
24 May – Necip Fazıl Kısakürek (born 1904), poet
28 May – Çiğdem Talu (born 1939), music lyricist
2 September – Feri Cansel (born 1944), actress (killed)
9 November – Rüştü Erdelhun (born 1894), army general

Gallery

See also
Turkey in the Eurovision Song Contest 1983
 1982–83 1.Lig

References

 
Years of the 20th century in Turkey
Turkey
Turkey
Turkey